The Kerry Dancers (subtitled and Other Swinging Folk) is an album by jazz saxophonist Johnny Griffin which was recorded in late 1961 and early 1962 and released on the Riverside label.

Reception

The AllMusic site reviewer Alex Henderson stated: "Many straight-ahead bop musicians would never consider recording traditional folk songs from the British Isles, but that's exactly what Johnny Griffin does... one of his best releases of the 1960s... The Kerry Dancers and Other Swinging Folk is among the many Griffin releases that the Chicagoan can be proud of".

Track listing
 "The Kerry Dancers" (Traditional) - 4:44  
 "Black Is the Color of My True Love's Hair" (Traditional) - 6:15  
 "Green Grow the Rushes" (Traditional) - 4:38  
 "The Londonderry Air" (Traditional) - 4:54  
 "25½ Daze" (Sara Cassey) - 4:42  
 "Oh, Now I See" (Johnny Griffin) - 5:11  
 "Hush-a-Bye" (Traditional) - 4:56  
 "Ballad for Monsieur" (Cassey) - 3:35  
Recorded at Plaza Sound Studios in New York City on December 21, 1961 (tracks 2, 6 & 7), January 5, 1962 (tracks 3, 5 & 8) and January 29, 1962 (tracks 1 & 4).

Personnel
Johnny Griffin — tenor saxophone
Barry Harris - piano
Ron Carter - bass
Ben Riley - drums

References 

1962 albums
Johnny Griffin albums
Riverside Records albums
Albums produced by Orrin Keepnews